Ode to the Ghetto is the debut solo studio album by American rapper Guilty Simpson from the Almighty Dreadnaughtz. It was released on March 25, 2008 via Stones Throw Records. Production of the album was handled by seven record producers, including Madlib, Mr. Porter, Oh No, J Dilla, Black Milk, DJ Babu, Konphlict, and Peanut Butter Wolf, who served as executive producer. It also features guest appearances from Black Milk, Sean Price, MED, Kon Artis, and Simpson's A.D. groupmates Konnie Ross, Kriz Steel, Supa Emcee.

Critical reception
Steven J. Horowitz of PopMatters gave the album 8 stars out of 10, calling it "one of the most honest and captivating records to come from Detroit's hip-hop scene in recent years." He said, "Simpson covers all the bases of street life on this fantastic debut, and like some Detroit artists who came before him, he offers a unique recounting of the many facets of city life." Meanwhile, Ian Cohen of Pitchfork gave the album a 4.5 out of 10, saying, "Stones Throw interrupts its wise exploration of alternative hip-hop and puts its goodwill on the line in order to release a thoroughly mediocre gangsta rap album."

Track listing

Personnel
Byron Simpson – main artist
Denaun Porter – featured artist (tracks: 6, 12), producer (tracks: 2, 6, 12)
Nick Rodriguez – featured artist (track 8)
Curtis Cross – featured artist (track 11), producer (tracks: 10, 11, 14), mixing & recording
Sean DeJean Price – featured artist (track 11)
Corey Wilson – featured artist & producer (track 16)
Kent Brown – featured artist (track 16)
Kriz Steel – featured artist (track 16)
Noelle Scaggs – additional vocals (track 7)
Jason Jackson – scratches (tracks: 1, 2, 13)
Otis Jackson, Jr. – producer (tracks: 1, 3, 8, 9, 13), scratches
Michael Jackson Woodrow Sr. – producer (tracks: 4, 5)
James Dewitt Yancey – producer (track 7)
Chris Oroc – producer (track 15)
Chris Manak – executive producer
Alex Merzin – mixing & recording
Mike Chav – mixing & recording
Pete Lyman – mixing & recording
Kelly Hibbert – mixing, mastering & recording
Eothen Aram Alapatt – A&R
Jeffrey Carlson – art direction
Eric Coleman – photography
Eugene Howell – management

Charts

References

External links
 

2008 debut albums
Guilty Simpson albums
Stones Throw Records albums
Albums produced by Madlib
Albums produced by J Dilla
Albums produced by Black Milk
Albums produced by Mr. Porter
Albums produced by Oh No (musician)